The basketball tournaments of National Collegiate Athletic Association (Philippines) 78th season hosted by San Beda College began on June 29, 2002 at the Araneta Coliseum with Philippine Sports Commission chairman Eric Buhain as the special guest, followed by the opening ceremonies, a ceremonial toss together with NCAA Policy Board president Fr. Anscar Chupungco, OSB, and a quadruple-header. Games then are subsequently held at Rizal Memorial Coliseum. This was the first season of ABS-CBN's live coverage of the seniors’ games aired at Studio 23.

Seniors' tournament

Elimination round

Team standing

Match-up results

Scores
Results on top and to the right of the dashes are for first-round games; those to the bottom and to the left of it are second-round games.

Bracket 

Number of asterisks (*) denotes the number of overtime periods.

Semifinals 
San Sebastian and Benilde have the twice-to-beat advantage. They only have to win once, while their opponents, twice, to progress.

San Sebastian vs. JRU 

It was a nip-and-tuck affair all game until JRU's Edward Attunga converted two free throws to give his team its first lead of the game, 85–84, with 59 seconds left. San Sebastian's Redentor Vicente was fouled on a drive, but split his charities to tie the game at 85-all with 22 seconds remaining in the final period. JRU's Wynsjohn Te had a chance to win the game but missed a difficult lay-up, sending the game into overtime. Defending champs San Sebastian's trifecta of Redentor Vicente, Clark Moore, and Michael Gonzales needed an extra five minutes to beat the Heavy Bombers and advance to the Finals.

Benilde vs. PCU 

It was PCU's game throughout the first half of Game 1 when they saw their main big man Bernzon Franco sidelined with an ankle sprain. But PCU maintained its composure to control the distance until CSB's Jay Sagad, Sunday Salvacion, and Elvis Tolentino force a comeback to send the game into overtime. Franco returned to the game, but PCU's treys decided the final outcome and forces the Blazers to a knockout game.

PCU tried its best to close the gap in Game 2, but the Blazers maintained its double-digit distance all throughout the game thanks to their stars, Jay Sagad and Sunday Salvacion. Salvacion finished with 34 points, including four triples and a dunk with four minutes remaining, sending the CSB gallery into a frenzy.

Finals 
This is a rematch of the 2000 Finals, which the Blazers won after sweeping the Stags en route to their first championship.

Finals Most Valuable Player: 
The Stags were down by as many as 11 points in the first half of Game 1, thanks to the hot-shooting of Sunday Salvacion and the inside presence of Al Magpayo and Ronald Capati. But Stags veteran Christian Coronel took over and made his two free throws in the last two seconds after he was hacked by CSB's Elvis Tolentino to lead his team closer to the championship.

The Stags did not let CSB to take over as they pummeled the Blazers right from the start of Game 2, even held them scoreless for almost eight minutes into the final period, thus claiming their second consecutive championship and eleventh title overall. Leomar Najorda was named Finals MVP.

Awards 
 Most Valuable Player: 
 Rookie of the Year:  
 Mythical Five:
 
 
 
 
 
 Defensive Player of the Year:  
 Most Improved Player:  
 Coach of the Year:

Juniors' tournament

Bracket

Finals 
Since San Beda swept the elimination round, they have a twice-to-beat advantage over Letran. This is a de facto best of three series with San Beda automatically leading 1-0. Therefore, San Beda has to win once, while Letran needed twice, to win the championship.

Finals Most Valuable Player: 
San Beda was in command for most of Game 1, but Letran refused to lose and then took the lead, 90–88. San Beda then tied the game 93–all, thanks to Ford Arao's two free throws, 47 seconds remaining in the final period. In the next play, OJ Cua gave the lead again to the Squires, 95–93. Both teams split their charities in the final seconds, when Squire Marlon Bituin grabbed the miss from the other team, giving the Red Cubs their first loss of the season and sealing the victory for the Squires.

The Red Cubs claimed their 11th NCAA juniors championship in the deciding Game 2, thanks to JVee Casio and Arvin Braganza's outside shooting and Jay Agbayani's inside presence.

Awards 
 Most Valuable Player: 
 Rookie of the Year: 
 Mythical Five:
 
 
 
 
 
 Defensive Player of the Year: 
 Most Improved Player: 
 Coach of the Year:

See also 
 UAAP Season 65 men's basketball tournament

References 

78
2002 in Philippine basketball